Hiram W. Roblier (May 7, 1823October 26, 1897) was an American businessman and Republican politician.  He served one term in the Wisconsin State Assembly, representing Columbia County.

Biography
Roblier was born on May 7, 1823, in Big Flats, New York. In 1853, Roblier moved to Lowville, Wisconsin and settled in the town of Wyocena in 1854. He married Deborah Rowley or Sawley (1831–1907) in 1855. He was a farmer. Roblier served in the Wisconsin Assembly in 1874 as a Republican. He also served as chairman of the Wyocena Town Board and as Superintendent of the Poor for Columbia County, Wisconsin. In 1884, Roblier moved to Coloma, Wisconsin, and worked in the mercantile business.

References

External links

People from Big Flats, New York
People from Wyocena, Wisconsin
People from Coloma, Wisconsin
Businesspeople from Wisconsin
Farmers from Wisconsin
Republican Party members of the Wisconsin State Assembly
Mayors of places in Wisconsin
1823 births
1897 deaths
Burials in Wisconsin
19th-century American politicians